Bride for Rent is a 2014 Filipino romantic comedy film directed by Mae Czarina Cruz starring Kim Chiu and Xian Lim. It is produced by Star Cinema as its opening salvo for the year. The film achieved numerous milestones: it became the second highest grossing Filipino romantic comedy movie of all-time after It Takes a Man and a Woman; the sixth highest grossing non-MMFF film after Hello, Love, Goodbye, The Hows of Us, Maid in Malacañang, The Unkabogable Praybeyt Benjamin, and It Takes a Man and a Woman; and the highest-grossing Filipino film to be released in January.

The film's trailer became a viral hit prior to the film's premier garnering over 2 million views as of January 25, 2014 and was frequently part of the local Twitter trending topics during its theatrical run. It also received an average rating of 7.5/10 in IMDb and a 3.9/5 in Rotten Tomatoes with 73% liking the said film as of February 12. It was graded "B" by the Cinema Evaluation Board and rated PG by the MTRCB.

Plot
Rocco Espiritu (Xian Lim) and Rocky Dela Cruz (Kim Chiu) have one thing in common: they are both in need of money, fast.

On the eve of his 25th birthday, the day he's set to receive money from his grandmother, Lala's trust fund, Rocco parties, gets drunk, and loses all his money on a poker match. Now he has to produce the amount, otherwise he will lose the client he needs to defeat his father's TV commercial production company. Meanwhile, Rocky also needs money to pay the rent, otherwise her family will be homeless.
 
The only way for Rocco to get money from his trust fund is to fulfill the conditions set by his grandmother and that is to get married. That's when he meets Rocky who agrees to act as his pseudo wife in exchange for a “talent fee.” With Rocco's tempting offer and Rocky's need for money, the two seal the deal. However, Lala sees through their ruse but is sympathetic with Rocky, helping her deal with her grandson and officially hiring her to continue the fraud. After a series of slow starts, the "married" couple start an idea to jumpstart their finances by creating a film on relationships featuring married couples. Rocco develops genuine feelings for Rocky and proposes to her at a dinner with Lala and his father. But Rocky, who feels guilt at having to engage in the fraud, refuses, tells the whole truth and walks out. Lala later urges Rocco to reconcile with his father and seek out Rocky, seeing how they are in love with each other. The two eventually reconcile and marry for real, with both finally stable financially.

Cast

Main cast
Kim Chiu as Racquelita "Rocky" Dela Cruz
Xian Lim as Roderico "Rocco" Espiritu, Jr.

Supporting cast
Pilita Corrales as Avelina "Lala" Corazon
Dennis Padilla as Papsi/Nitoy Dela Cruz
Martin del Rosario as Mik Antonio
Empoy Marquez as Javier
Matt Evans as Onyok Dela Cruz
Eda Nolan as Carding's Wife
Anita Linda as Lola Czarina
 Tony Mabesa as Mr. Benjamin
Alex Castro as Videoke Male Artist
Helga Krapf as Gretchen
Marlann Flores as Bekya
 Zeppi Borromeo as Iking Dela Cruz
 Lloyd Zaragoza as Carding Dela Cruz
 Gerald Pesigan as Mikoy Dela Cruz
 Santino Espinoza as Chin Dela Cruz
 Leo Rialp as Cito Romualdez
 Rj Ledesma as Atty. Marty Llamas

Guest cast

 Ivan Asuncion as Young Rocco
 Artemio C. Abad Jr. as Videoke Director
 Loven Canon as Marsique
 Patricia Prieto as Tricia
 Mark Mcmahon as Tricia's Husband
 Regine "Apan" T. Agra as Kukai
 Angel Remulla as Rocco's Mom
 Amelia Villaruel as Maricel
 Jackie Aquino as Rod's Wife

Special participation

Tirso Cruz III as Roderico "Rod" Espiritu, Sr. (Rocco's father)
Bodie Cruz as young Roderico Espiritu Sr. (Rocco's father in picture)
 Mr. & Mrs. Eugene and Jacqueline Kaw as themselves
 Mr. & Mrs. Gary and MM Bogarin as themselves
 Mr. & Mrs. Nor and Pia Domingo as themselves
 Mr. & Mrs. Ed and Baby Ferriols as themselves
 Mr. & Mrs. Robert and Dina Labayen as themselves
 Mr. & Mrs. Nelson and Millie Villar as themselves

References

External links
Official website

2014 films
Star Cinema films
Philippine romantic comedy films